Wheeling Island is the most populated island in the Ohio River. It lies within the city of Wheeling in Ohio County, West Virginia, in the United States. Neville Island, Pennsylvania, is larger but has fewer people (1,232).

Wheeling Island lies at the mouths of Wheeling Creek of Ohio and Wheeling Creek of West Virginia. The island is home to the Wheeling Island Hotel-Casino-Racetrack at Wheeling Downs and Wheeling Island Stadium, home of the West Virginia State Football Championships.

Wheeling Island has a number of historic homes featuring Victorian Architecture. An elementary school (Madison Elementary, by Prominent WV Architect F.F. Faris, also Wheeling Island is the location of his personal residence), churches, a public pool (Bridge Park Pool), and several restaurants are located on the island.

A section of Wheeling Island is protected as part of the Ohio River Islands National Wildlife Refuge.

Transportation
Wheeling Island is connected to downtown Wheeling via the Fort Henry Bridge, carrying Interstate 70, U.S. Route 40, and U.S. Route 250, and the Wheeling Suspension Bridge, carrying the National Road.

Two additional bridges cross the back channel of the Ohio River to connect the island to Bridgeport, one for Interstate 70, and a second for US 250 and US 40. The Aetnaville Bridge also crosses the back channel of the Ohio River, but was closed to vehicle traffic in 1988 and to the public in 2016 over safety concerns.

Variant names 
Originally known by various names including Zanes Island and Madison Island, the Board on Geographic Names decided upon Wheeling Island as the bar's official name in 1902. Local residents refer to it as simply "The Island."

See also 
List of islands of West Virginia
Harry C. and Jessie F. Franzheim House
John McLure House

References

External links
Wheeling Island Racetrack & Gaming Center
Wheeling Island.org - Information and Resources
Creative Impressions Publisher of Wheeling Island: A Photographic History  by Robert W. Schramm

River islands of West Virginia
Geography of Wheeling, West Virginia
Islands of the Ohio River
Landforms of Ohio County, West Virginia